Typhlacontias punctatissimus, also known commonly as the dotted blind dart skink, the speckled burrowing skink, and the speckled western burrowing skink, is a species of lizard in the family Scincidae. The species is native to southern Africa. Three subspecies are recognized.

Geographic range
T. punctatissimus found in Angola and Namibia.

Habitat 

Description
It has no eyelids, no external ear openings, and usually no legs. However, some specimens may have rudimentary hind limbs. Dorsally, it is golden brown, with many black dots forming lines. The ventral surface of the tail is silvery blue.

Behavior
T. punctatissimus is terrestrial and fossorial.

Reproduction
T. punctatissimus is viviparous.

Subspecies
Three subspecies are recognized as being valid, including the nominotypical subspecies.
Typhlacontias punctatissimus bogerti 
Typhlacontias punctatissimus brainei 
Typhlacontias punctatissimus punctatissimus

Etymology
The subspecific name, bogerti, is in honor of American herpetologist Charles Mitchill Bogert.

The subspecific name, brainei, is in honor of Steve Braine, who was a ranger at Skeleton Coast National Park, Namibia.

References

Further reading
Bocage JVB (1873). "Mélanges erpétologiques. II. Sur quelques Reptiles et Batraciens nouveaux, rares ou peu connus d'Afrique occidentale". Jornal de Sciencias Mathematicas, Physicas e Naturaes, Academia Real das Sciencias da Lisboa 4 (15): 209–227. (Typhlacontias punctatissimus, new species, pp. 213–214). (in French).
Haacke WD (1997). "Systematics and biogeography of the southern African scincine genus Typhlacontias (Reptilia: Scincidae)". Bonner Zoologische Beiträge 47 (1–2): 139–163. (Typhlacontias punctatissimus brainei, new subspecies, pp. 150–151 + Figures 3c, 8).
Laurent RF (1964). "Reptiles et batraciens de l'Angola (troisième contribution)". Companhia de Diamantes de Angola (DIAMANG), Serviços Culturais, Museu do Dundo (Angola) 67: 1–165. (Typhlacontias bogerti, new species, p. 82). (in French).
Whiting AS, Bauer AM, Sites JW (2003). "Phylogenetic relationships and limb loss in sub-Saharan African scincine lizards (Squamata: Scincidae)". Molecular Phylogenetics and Evolution 29 (3): 582–598.

punctatissimus
Reptiles described in 1873
Taxa named by José Vicente Barbosa du Bocage